Patrick S. Ryder is an American military officer and United States Air Force brigadier general who has served as the Pentagon Press Secretary since August 4, 2022.

Commissioned via AFROTC from the University of Florida in 1992, Ryder has almost 30 years of service as a communications and public affairs officer.

References

External links

|-

Living people

Year of birth missing (living people)
Brigadier generals
United States Air Force generals
Military personnel from Florida
University of Florida alumni
Bowie State University alumni
University of Salzburg alumni
Dwight D. Eisenhower School for National Security and Resource Strategy alumni
Recipients of the Defense Superior Service Medal
Recipients of the Meritorious Service Medal (United States)
United States Department of Defense officials
Biden administration personnel